Wang Gang (born 24 August 1960) is a Chinese writer, probably best known for co-writing the screenplays for Feng Xiaogang's The Dream Factory (1997) and A World Without Thieves (2004), both huge box office hits in China. He also wrote novels, one of which has been translated into English.

Works translated into English

Filmography

Film awards

References

1960 births
Living people
People from Shihezi
Screenwriters from Xinjiang
20th-century Chinese novelists
21st-century Chinese novelists
Chinese male novelists
Northwest University (China) alumni
20th-century Chinese male writers
21st-century male writers